Troy Menzel (born 22 September 1994) is a former professional Australian rules footballer who played for the Carlton Football Club and Adelaide Football Club in the Australian Football League (AFL). He was drafted at pick 11 in the 2012 national draft by Carlton, and was traded to Adelaide after the 2015 season. He is the younger brother of former  player Daniel Menzel.

Pre-AFL career
Menzel attended King's Baptist Grammar School, and played his junior football for the Golden Grove Football Club before joining  in the minor grades of the South Australian National Football League. In 2012, at age 17, Menzel was playing senior football for Centrals; he also represented South Australia at the AFL Under 18 Championships in 2012, kicking fifteen goals in two matches, but missing the rest of the games due to injury. Seen as one of the most talented players in the 2012 National Draft, several clubs were cautious about taking Menzel due to his injury-prone knees – he had suffered injuries to both knees during his junior years, and underwent a LARS reconstruction at age 16, in which the natural ligament is augmented with synthetic tissue. This saw him slide to 's first pick at 11 overall, and having rated him as the second-best player in the draft, they were quick to pounce on him.

AFL career

Carlton (2013–2015)
Menzel made his senior AFL debut for the club in round 8, 2013, where he was prominent in the forward line with his tackling pressure. Towards the end of 2014 he signed a new two-year contract with Carlton.

In October 2015, Menzel was traded to Adelaide in exchange for pick 28 and Sam Kerridge. He had played 40 games in three years for Carlton and kicked 47 goals.

Adelaide (2016–2017)
After failing to play a senior game in 2016, Menzel made his debut for Adelaide in round 1, 2017, against  at the Adelaide Oval. He kicked one goal and gained up 14 possessions as the Crows won by 56 points. 

Menzel was delisted at the end of 2017.

Post-AFL career
Menzel played for suburban club Tea Tree Gully in 2018, and was best on the ground in their grand final victory that year. This would lead to Menzel returning to Central District for two seasons before transferring to Woodville West Torrens in 2021. He was joined by his brother Daniel and together were instrumental in the Eagles winning their first ever back to back SANFL premiership.

Statistics
 Statistics are correct to end of the 2017 season

|- style="background:#eaeaea;"
! scope="row" style="text-align:center" | 2013
| style="text-align:center" | 
| 2 || 7 || 8 || 6 || 39 || 12 || 51 || 19 || 13 || 1.1 || 0.9 || 5.6 || 1.7 || 7.3 || 2.7 || 1.9
|- 
! scope="row" style="text-align:center" | 2014
| style="text-align:center" | 
| 2 || 19 || 26 || 13 || 130 || 45 || 175 || 66 || 28 || 1.4 || 0.7 || 6.8 || 2.4 || 9.2 || 3.5 || 1.5
|- style="background:#eaeaea;"
! scope="row" style="text-align:center" | 2015
| style="text-align:center" | 
| 2 || 14 || 13 || 7 || 87 || 43 || 130 || 46 || 24 || 0.9 || 0.5 || 6.2 || 3.1 || 9.3 || 3.3 || 1.7
|-
! scope="row" style="text-align:center" | 2016
|
| 32 || 0 || — || — || — || — || — || — || — || — || — || — || — || — || — || —
|- style="background:#eaeaea;"
! scope="row" style="text-align:center" | 2017
| style="text-align:center" | 
| 32 || 4 || 4 || 3 || 26 || 12 || 38 || 10 || 13 || 1.0 || 0.8 || 6.5 || 3.0 || 9.5 || 2.5 || 3.3
|- class="sortbottom"
! colspan=3| Career
! 44
! 51
! 29
! 282
! 112
! 394
! 141
! 78
! 1.2
! 0.7
! 6.4
! 2.5
! 9.0
! 3.2
! 1.8
|}

References

External links

Australian rules footballers from South Australia
1994 births
Living people
Carlton Football Club players
Preston Football Club (VFA) players
Central District Football Club players
Adelaide Football Club players